The Ministry of Defense of Turkmenistan is a government agency under the Armed Forces of Turkmenistan which is the executive body in implementing defence policies in Turkmenistan. The current Minister of Defense is Major General Begenç Gündogdyýew. It was founded in January 1992 with the assistance of the Russian Armed Forces.

At its formation, most of the ethnic Turkmen employees were retired Soviet officials and members of the Communist Party of the Turkmen SSR, with other officials coming from small backgrounds such as chief of staff Annamurat Soltanov who had served in Afghanistan and Begdzhan Niyazov who had a career in law enforcement prior to his rising to his position.

List of Ministers of Defense

Defense Ministry institutions, units and areas 

Sections of the defence ministry include some of the following institutions:

Educational institutions
 Military Institute of the Ministry of Defense
 Berdimuhamed Annayev 1st Specialized Military School (Ashgabat)
 Alp Arslan 2nd Specialized Military School (Dashoguz)
 Soltan Sanjar 3rd Specialized Military School (Mary)
Central House of Officers
"Merdana nesiller" Ensmeble
Military Museum named after Berdimuhamed Annayev
Center for Emergency Management (opened in January 2011)
Equestrian Complex of the Ministry of Defense (opened in 2012)
Central Army Sports Club
Various military training sites
 Akdepe Airdrome
 Kelyata Training Center (Bäherden District of the Ahal Region)
 Northern Kelete Training Ground (near the village of Kelete)
 Mountain Training Center "South Kelyata" (near Ashgabat)
 Ogurja Ada Naval Base
 Milli goşun (newspaper)
Youth Organization named after Magtymguly of the Ministry of Defense
Independent Honor Guard Battalion

House of Officers
Based on the Soviet model, the House of Officers is the main cultural center of the military designed to improve Civil–military relations. It is the equivalent to Military officers' clubs in the United States. Concerts of military ensembles such as the "Merdana nesiller" Ensemble, the Göreldeli Military Band and the "Sherhet Ovazlara" Ensemble of the State Border Service have performed at the House of Officers. The house hosts receptions on holidays such as Defender of the Fatherland Day and Independence Day. A special attraction of the House of Officers is the Museum of Military Glory, where numerous exhibits tell a history of Turkmen military history since the time of Oguz Khan. The building also has a stationary full-time professional television studio that prepares weekly television shows on the Altyn Asyr and Ovaz channels. It frequently hosts guests from the Military Institute and the military school.

Milli goşun 
The Defence Ministry issues its social and political magazine called Milli goşun (National Army) every quarter which has the information about the measures for strengthening of defensive capability of the country.

Department structure 

The defence ministry has the following command structure:

General Staff
General Directorate of Armaments
General Mobilization Directorate
General Directorate of Civil Defense and Rescue, it is the civil defence agency for Turkmenistan. It is similar to the Russian Ministry of Emergency Situations. It conducts joint exercises in the territories of industrial enterprises with non-militarized rescue workers of the enterprises themselves, developing tactics in the event of various natural disasters and rescue operations.
General Directorate of Supply and Logistics
Educational Directorate

See also 
 Ministry of Internal Affairs (Turkmenistan)

References

External links 
 

Defense
Turkmenistan
Military of Turkmenistan